Awori is a surname. Notable people with the surname include:

Aggrey Awori (1939–2021), Ugandan economist and politician
Maria Awori (born 1984), Kenyan swimmer
Moody Awori (born 1927), Kenyan politician
Wyllis Awori (born 2004), Kenyan rugby U21 player

See also
Awori tribe, a tribe of the Yoruba people

Awori wyllis 
2004
 Kenyan